is a Japanese musical group formed in 1998 by composer/arranger Yosuke Sugiyama and lyricist Tai Furusawa with vocalist Mari Mizuno. They debuted in 2000 with the album volume one. The group's name is an homage to the British musical group The Style Council, whose album Café Bleu features a song titled "The Paris Match".

The music of paris match is a fusion of diverse musical genres including bossa nova, jazz, acid-jazz, soul, blue-eyed soul, AOR, and house.

Discography

Albums
Volume One (April 21, 2000)
PM2 (August 1, 2001)
Type III (June 1, 2002)
Song for You (November 21, 2002)
Quattro (June 25, 2003)
Volume One Plus (April 21, 2004)
♭5 (July 16, 2004)
5th Anniversary (March 30, 2005)
After Six (March 24, 2006)
Our Favourite Pop (January 24, 2007)
BEST OF PARIS MATCH (June 20, 2007)
Remix & Rare "White" (June 20, 2007)
Flight 7 (February 13, 2008)
Passion8 (June 24, 2009)
to the nines (October 6, 2010)
edition 10 (November 21, 2012)
11 (December 16, 2015)
ROUND 12 (June 24, 2020)
Our Favourite Pop II - Tokyo Style (November 23, 2022)

Singles
"Happy-go-round" (November 22, 2000)
"Desert Moon" (April 4, 2001)
"Kiss" (July 18, 2001)
"Deep Inside" (November 21, 2001)
"Saturday" (June 5, 2002)
"Summer Breeze" (July 23, 2003)
"Taiyō no kiss" (太陽の接吻) (November 5, 2003)
"Koi no kizashi" (恋の兆し) (March 24, 2005)
"Voice" (November 23, 2005)

References

External links 
 Official website - coolism productions (Japanese)
 Official website - Victor Entertainment (Japanese)
 Official website - MySpace.com (Japanese)

Japanese rock music groups
Victor Entertainment artists